= Borderless World Volunteers =

Canada-based non-governmental organization

Borderless World Volunteers is an international organization founded in 2003 and a registered Canadian charity as of 2005. The mandate of the organization is to empower youth for leadership in global aid. Volunteers participate in the generation, verification, assessment and implementation of their own development projects. Past projects have been undertaken in the fields of microfinance, agriculture, health and education in Ghana, Brazil and India.

The organization currently operates through its member chapters at McGill University, Harvard University, the University of London and is in the process of developing a chapter at Stanford University.

In 2006, a new initiative was launched involving community outreach work in areas home to the Borderless World Volunteers Chapters. In addition several panel series have been organized pertaining to such international crises as climate change and HIV/AIDS.
